Gayabari (Nepali translation: The cowshed) is a tea garden village in the Kurseong CD block in the Kurseong subdivision of the Darjeeling District of West Bengal state, India.

Geography 
Gayabari Tea Garden village is administrated by Sarpanch (Head of Village) who is the elected representative of village.

Postal pin code: 734223

Postal head office: Tindharia.

Nearby cities & towns 

Kurseong: 15 km

Darjeeling: 44 km

Siliguri: 26 km

Demographics
As per Indian Population Census 2011, Gayabari Tea Garden has 99 families residing in the village and has a population of 460 of which 238 are males and 222 are females. Gayabari Tea Garden village has a higher literacy rate compared to the rest of West Bengal. The total geographical area of village is 236.34 hectares. Nepali is the main language spoken in Gayabari.

Transport 
The village is served by Gayabari railway station.

Notable persons 
 Yangdup Lama

Education
Netaji Junior High School is an English-medium coeducational institution established in 1965. It has arrangements for teaching from class V to class X. It has 6 computers, a library with 344 books and a playground.

Healthcare
There is a primary health centres at Gayabari, with 4 beds.

References 

Tea estates in West Bengal
Villages in Darjeeling district